Friedl Hardt (28 January 1919 – 11 June 1991) was a German actress.

Selected filmography
 The Tiger Akbar (1951)
 Mikosch Comes In (1952)
 Arena of Death (1953)
 Hooray, It's a Boy! (1953)
 The Three from the Filling Station (1955)
 Love Is Just a Fairytale (1955)
 Yes, Yes, Love in Tyrol (1955)
 Drei Mann auf einem Pferd (1957)

Bibliography
 Bergfelder, Tim & Bock, Hans-Michael. ''The Concise Cinegraph: Encyclopedia of German. Berghahn Books, 2009.

External links

1919 births
1991 deaths
German film actresses
Actresses from Munich
20th-century German actresses